Bathycongrus longicavis is an eel in the family Congridae (conger/garden eels). It was described by Emma Stanislavovna Karmovskaya in 2009. It is a tropical, marine eel which is known from the Pacific Ocean, including Vanuatu and the New Hebrides Trench. It dwells at a depth range of 532–599 metres. Males can reach a maximum total length of 38.6 centimetres.

The species epithet refers to the long cavity on the abdomen of the species.

References

longicavis
Fish described in 2009